Warrensburg is a city in and the county seat of Johnson County, Missouri, United States. The population was 20,313 at the 2020 census. The Warrensburg Micropolitan Statistical Area consists of Johnson County. The city is a college town as it is home to the University of Central Missouri.

History
Warrensburg was founded in 1835 by European-American settlers John and Martin D. Warren, who gave the town their last name. A post office called Warrensburg has been in operation since 1837.

The phrase "Man's best friend" is based on a famous trial over the killing of Old Drum, a dog who was shot in Warrensburg. In 1958, a statue of Old Drum was erected on the Johnson County Courthouse lawn containing a summation of US Senator George G. Vest's closing speech, “A man’s best friend is his dog.”

Demographics

The current mayor is Jim Kushner.

2010 census
As of the census of 2010, there were 18,838 people, 6,803 households, and 3,400 families living in the city. The racial makeup of the city was 85.3% White, 7.5% African American, 0.5% Native American, 2.8% Asian, 0.2% Pacific Islander, 0.7% from other races, and 3.1% from two or more races. Hispanic or Latino of any race were 3.1% of the population.

There were 6,803 households, of which 26.5% had children under the age of 18 living with them, 36.1% were married couples living together, 10.4% had a female householder with no husband present, 3.5% had a male householder with no wife present, and 50.0% were non-families. 31.2% of all households were made up of individuals, and 8.1% had someone living alone who was 65 years of age or older. The average household size was 2.32 and the average family size was 2.96.

The median age in the city was 23.7 years. 17.6% of residents were under the age of 18; 36.2% were between the ages of 18 and 24; 21.8% were from 25 to 44; 15% were from 45 to 64; and 9.5% were 65 years of age or older. The gender makeup of the city was 49.5% male and 50.5% female.

2000 census
As of the census of 2000, there were 16,340 people, 5,951 households, and 3,035 families living in the city. The population density was 1,938.5 people per square mile (748.4/km). There were 6,380 housing units at an average density of 756.9 per square mile (292.2/km). The racial makeup of the city was 90% White, 6.46% African American, 0.64% Native American, 2.79% Asian, 0.14% Pacific Islander, 0.78% from other races, and 2.28% from two or more races. Hispanic or Latino of any race were 2.44% of the population.

There were 3,951 households, out of which 26.6% had children under the age of 18 living with them, 38.5% were married couples living together, 9.9% had a female householder with no husband present, and 49.0% were non-families. 30.8% of all households were made up of individuals, and 8.5% had someone living alone who was 65 years of age or older. The average household size was 2.29 and the average family size was 2.93.

In the city, the population was spread out, with 18.0% under the age of 18, 36.5% from 18 to 24, 22.8% from 25 to 44, 12.9% from 45 to 64, and 9.7% who were 65 years of age or older. The median age was 23 years. For every 100 females, there were 95.8 males. For every 100 females age 18 and over, there were 95.4 males.

The median income for a household in the city was $29,332, and the median income for a family was $45,845. Males had a median income of $30,354 versus $22,154 for females. The per capita income for the city was $14,714. About 13.6% of families and 24.3% of the population were below the poverty line, including 17.1% of those under age 18 and 11.4% of those age 65 or over.

Education
Public elementary and secondary schools in Warrensburg are part of the Warrensburg R-VI School District. The district includes four elementary schools for grades preschool through fifth grade. Maple Grove and Ridgeview Elementary schools are for grades preschool through second grade while Martin Warren and Sterling elementary schools house students in grades three through five. Warrensburg Middle School serves students in grades six through eight and Warrensburg High School is for grades nine through 12. The district also operates the Reese Education Center, which houses the Gateway Alternative School and the district's special needs and gifted education programs. The Warrensburg Area Career Center specializes in vocational education for high school-aged students in Warrensburg and Johnson County.

The city is also home of the University of Central Missouri (UCM), known as Central Missouri State University until 2006. The university offers programs in 150 areas of study and serves approximately 12,500 students as of 2014.

Warrensburg has a public library, a branch of the Trails Regional Library.

Transportation

Major roads
  US 50 - Links to Lee's Summit and further to Kansas City to the west and Sedalia to the east.
  Route 13 - or Maguire Street, essentially divides the town in half though Old Highway 13 or Holden Street forms the division between east and west. This is a highway linking Warrensburg to Interstate 70 to the north, and Truman Lake to the south.

Air
 Skyhaven Airport

Other
 The Warrensburg Amtrak station provides Amtrak service between Kansas City and St. Louis via the Missouri River Runner.
Jefferson Lines bus service to/from Kansas City and Springfield, Missouri
"Emergency Taxi Service" – Taxi service serving the Johnson County area.

Media

Newspapers
Warrensburg Star-Journal – twice a week (Tuesday and Friday)

Television
KMOS-TV (PBS), PBS 6.1, CREATE CHANNEL 6.2 and PBS WORLD 6.3. The city of license is Syracuse, MO. The offices and studios are located on the campus of UCM in Warrensburg.

Radio

Notable people

 John William 'Blind' Boone (1864–1927), concert pianist, composer and principal for the Blind Boone Concert Company
 Errett Lobban Cord, automobile manufacturer and advocate of front-wheel-drive vehicles
 Ada and Minna Everleigh, proprietors of the Everleigh Club brothel in Chicago
 Mary Fallin, Governor of Oklahoma and former lieutenant governor of Oklahoma
 Douglas Eads Foster, member of the Los Angeles City Council
 Archie Scott Gobber, visual artist
Dan Houx, member of the Missouri House of Representatives
 Dean Hughes (born 1943), children's author and academic
 Henry Warren Ogden (1842–1905), member of the United States House of Representatives and Louisiana House of Representatives
 Sidney Toler (April 28, 1874February 12, 1947), actor and writer
 Kimberly Wyatt, former member of female pop group The Pussycat Dolls
 Shawn Pelton (born 1963), musician
 Curtis Niles Cooper, mathematician and professor at the University of Central Missouri

In popular media
Warrensburg was mentioned in the 1983 American television movie The Day After, which largely takes place in eastern Kansas and western Missouri. The city was one of the locations considered for the principal filming location and setting before the production team chose Lawrence, Kansas.

Geography

Climate

References

External links

 
 Warrensburg Chamber of Commerce

 
Cities in Johnson County, Missouri
Cities in Missouri
County seats in Missouri
1835 establishments in Missouri
Populated places established in 1835